Deh Gerdu or Dehgerdu may refer to:
 Galgun (disambiguation), Fars Province
 Deh Gerdu (30°21′ N 51°40′ E), Mamasani, Fars Province
 Deh Gerdu, Kerman